The Segambut KTM Komuter station (formerly Segambut railway station) is a Malaysian commuter train station located in the northern area of Kuala Lumpur along the Port Klang Line.

The Segambut Komuter station was built to cater traffic in Segambut, a suburban area situated near Kepong, which is also connected via the Kepong Komuter station and the Kepong Sentral Komuter station a few kilometres away.

This station was planned in the 1990s to be a terminus for KL Monorail's extension route from Titiwangsa station, which never materialised.

Service suspension during off-peak hours
Since June 2018, as a result of track upgrading works, the Port Klang Line is reduced to two shuttle services - one between Tanjong Malim and Kepong, and the other between KL Sentral and Port Klang. Trains only stop at Segambut station 13 times a day: six to Port Klang between 7 am and 2:30 pm; and seven to Tanjong Malim (one at 06:50, one at 12:39, and five between 17:00 and 21:30).

Previously, a free replacement shuttle bus route KTM3 to KL Sentral, operated by rapidKL, was provided. Since October 2019, that route was merged with route T819, which also connects to MRT Pusat Bandar Damansara and MRT Semantan.

Around the station
 Segambut industrial area
 Kuala Lumpur Courts Complex
 Jalan Duta
 MATRADE Exhibition and Convention Centre
 Mont Kiara
 Sri Hartamas

Feeder buses

See also
 Rail transport in Malaysia

References

External links
 Segambut KTM Komuter Station

Rawang-Seremban Line
Railway stations in Kuala Lumpur